Coelenteramine is a metabolic product of the bioluminescent reactions in organisms that utilize coelenterazine. It was first isolated from Aequorea victoria along with coelenteramide after coelenterates were stimulated to emit light.

References

External links

Bioluminescence
Aminopyrazines
Phenols